Ludwig Goiginger was an Austro-Hungarian Lieutenant Field Marshal who notably served in World War I.

Biography

Early life
After graduating from high school in Salzburg, he entered the military engineer cadet school in Vienna in 1881. In 1884 he joined the Genie Regiment 2 in Krems and became a lieutenant. After attending the War Academy from 1888 to 1890, he was assigned to the General Staff Corps as an adjutant and was given a permanent position in 1893.  He was appointed colonel in 1906. From 1907 to 1908, he was "military assistant" in the Austro-Hungarian mission, part of an international mission responsible for supervising the Ottoman Gendarmerie in Macedonia, and he fought the armed bands around Skopje in the Kosovo Vilayet. After more than 20 years of staff activity, he took over command of the newly established 122nd Infantry Brigade in Bruneck on 27 February 1912, which was assigned in peace to the 8th Infantry Division (FML Johann Freiherr von Kirchbach auf Lauterbach) and was promoted to major general in May 1912.

World War I

During the mobilization of August 1914 , the 122nd Brigade (1st K.u.k. Feldjäger Regiment) and the 87th Infantry Brigade are grouped into the new 44th Landwehr Infantry Division by Heinrich Tschurtschenthaler, who was part the Austro-Hungarian XIV Corps on the Eastern Front in Galicia, in the area of modern-day Rava-Ruska. On 1 October he was appointed head of the 32nd Infantry Division attached to the 2nd Army which was commanded by General Eduard von Böhm-Ermolli. During winter 1914–1915, he was given command of the Goiginger group, including its division, and the 103rd Landsturm Brigade, engaged in the Battle of the Carpathians. In March 1915, He undertook for some time the command of the 44th Landwehr Division of the XVIII Corps commanded by General Alfred von Ziegler. On 9 May 1915 he was named Feldmarschall-Leutnant.

With the Italian entry into World War I, he was sent to the Italian front where on 5 June 1915, he received the command of the Division Pustertal in Tyrol defence command's District V under General der Kavallerie Viktor Dankl von Krasnik's authority. He engaged on the front of the Dolomites. On 17 April 1916, at Col di Lana, in its command sector, the explosion of a passage mined by Italian sappers engulfed a whole Kaiserjäger company.

At the end of August 1916, with Romania's entry into the war, he was sent to Transylvania. On 12 October 1916 he was appointed head of the 73rd Division attached to the German 9th Army commanded by the General Konrad Krafft von Dellmensingen.

After victorious fighting on the Romanian front, Goiginger was sent back to the Italian front. He controls the 60th  Division in the highlight of the Monte San Gabriele on the Isonzo. During the Eleventh Battle of the Isonzo, on 22 August 1917, his defence of Jelenik earned him the gold Medal for Bravery. During the Battle of Caporetto, the 60th Division, integrated into Armeegruppe Kosak (2nd Army of the Isonzo, General Johann von Henriquez), participates in the offensive German-Austro-Hungarian who routs the Italian 2nd Army. On 8 March 1918 he was appointed to the head of XXIV Corps comprising the 55th and 60th Divisions and part of the 94th Division, in the Monte Asolone area.

In June 1918, the Goiginger corps takes part in the Second Battle of the Piave River, the Central Powers' last attempt to wrest the decision on the Italian front. It occupied a bridgehead in Montello and, on 19 June, repulsed an Italian counter-attack, capturing 12,000 prisoners and 84 cannons. General Svetozar Boroević, the front's commander, found a way to exploit Montello's position as a base for the next offensive. But Erich Ludendorff, head of the German High Staff, said that Germany could not provide additional resources because it had to devote all its reserves to the Western front. Having consulted with the Austro-Hungarian Chief of Staff Arthur Arz von Straußenburg, Emperor Charles decided on 20 June to abandon the offensive and to withdraw its forces north of Piave. Goiginger initially refuses to give up hard-won territory but, on reiterated orders, ends up submitting. Bosnian, Hungarian and Austrian soldiers evacuate Montello, the last troops withdrawing on 23 June, ending the battle. This action earned Goiginger the Military Order of Maria Theresa.On 19 July he was appointed head of the Austro-Hungarian troops on the French front. The XVIII Corps comprised the 1st, 35th, 37th Divisions and the 16th Landsturm Division, attached to the Army Group Gallwitz. From October 1918, he was engaged in the Orne and suffered heavy losses against the American Expeditionary Forces. On 3 November, by the Armistice of Villa Giusti, Austria-Hungary withdrew from the conflict. The Austro-Hungarian corps in France was evacuated to Arlon then, on 10 November, towards Thionville. The last Austro-Hungarian troops left Germany on 29 November, disperse in the new states resulting from the breakup of the Habsburg monarchy.

Family and final years
His older brother, Heinrich Goiginger (1861–1927), during the war, reached the rank of Feldzeugmeister (senior artillery officer).

Ludwig Goiginger retires from military service on 1 January 1919 and retired to the Republic of German-Austria, to Graz-Neustift, where he died in 1931.

References

External links
 
 Biographie auf austro-hungarian-army

1863 births
1931 deaths
People from Verona
People from Udine
19th-century Austrian people
20th-century Austrian people
Austro-Hungarian Army officers
Austro-Hungarian military personnel of World War I
Austrian lieutenant field marshals
Commanders Cross of the Military Order of Maria Theresa